Rebecca Burrum Matlock (1928–2019) was an American photographer and the wife of former U.S. Ambassador Jack F. Matlock, Jr.

Biography
Born Rebecca Inez Burrum in Manchester, Tennessee to Hugh H. Burrum and Leona M. Graham, she lived in Waverly and Gallatin, Tennessee. As an undergraduate at Duke University she met and married Jack F. Matlock, Jr.

After graduation, they moved to New York City where both took graduate studies at Columbia University. In 1953 they moved to Hanover, New Hampshire, where the first three of their children (James, Hugh, and Nell) were born.  In 1956 the Matlocks joined the Foreign Service and were posted in following years to Vienna, Oberammergau, Moscow, Accra, Zanzibar, and Dar es Salaam. Two more children were born during their first tour in Moscow (David and Joseph).

The Matlocks served four tours  in the Soviet Union, between 1961 and 1991, and during that time she travelled to 14 of the 15 Union Republics. They were posted to Moscow in 1961, 1974, 1981, and finally in 1987 when Jack Matlock was appointed U.S. Ambassador to the Soviet Union. During their final tour they lived at Spaso House in Moscow until 1991 and their retirement from the Foreign Service.

After leaving the Foreign Service they lived for five years in North Stonington, Connecticut, and New York City; and then moved to Princeton, New Jersey. In 2009 she was named Honorary Trustee of the Friends of Davis International Center of Princeton University. In later years the Matlocks divided their time between a home in Princeton and her family farm in Booneville, Tennessee.

On November 9, 2019, Ambassador Matlock posted publicly on his Facebook: "My beloved wife of 70 years, Rebecca Burrum Matlock, passed away this morning in Duke University Hospital." The cause of death has not yet been made public.

Sarah Caldwell biography
Matlock served on the board of the Opera Company of Boston and interviewed director Sarah Caldwell over the course of several years to produce her biography, Challenges: A Memoir of My Life in Opera.

Photography exhibits
Matlock has had more than 50 exhibits of her photographs, as well as a series of exhibits by photographer Donald Schomacker.

Published works
 At Spaso House: People and meetings: Notes of the wife of an American ambassador (in Russian) Transl. from English by T. Kudriavtseva, Moscow:  EKSMO, Algorithm, 2004 
 Challenges: A Memoir of My Life in Opera by Caldwell, Sarah with Matlock, Rebecca, Middletown, Conn. : Wesleyan University Press, 2008

Notes

1928 births
2019 deaths
Photographers from Tennessee
People from Manchester, Tennessee
Columbia University alumni
Duke University alumni
American women photographers
People from Waverly, Tennessee
People from Gallatin, Tennessee
21st-century American women